Alexander "Chi Chi" González (born January 15, 1992) is an American professional baseball pitcher in the Miami Marlins organization. He has previously played in the MLB for the Texas Rangers, Colorado Rockies, Minnesota Twins, Milwaukee Brewers, and the New York Yankees. González goes by Chi Chi, a nickname given to him by his grandfather.

Career

Amateur career
Gonzalez attended Boca Raton Community High School in Boca Raton, Florida, and played for the school's baseball team as a pitcher and third baseman. The Baltimore Orioles selected Gonzalez in the 11th round of the 2010 MLB draft. Rather than sign with the Orioles, Gonzalez attended Oral Roberts University, where he played college baseball for the Oral Roberts Golden Eagles. In 2012, he played collegiate summer baseball in the Cape Cod Baseball League for the Yarmouth-Dennis Red Sox.

Texas Rangers
He was drafted by the Rangers in the 1st round (23rd overall) of the 2013 MLB Draft. He made his professional debut with the Spokane Indians and also played for the Myrtle Beach Pelicans. Prior to the 2014 season, Baseball Prospectus rated Gonzalez as the 70th best prospect in baseball. He started the season with Myrtle Beach before being promoted to the Double-A Frisco RoughRiders. He started 2015 with the Triple-A Round Rock Express.

Gonzalez was called up to the majors for the first time on May 30, 2015, and made his MLB debut that day. He faced the veteran lineup of the Boston Red Sox and began the game pitching  innings without surrendering a hit. It was the longest no-hit stretch to begin a career for a Rangers pitcher since 1992. On June 5, 2015, Gonzalez threw a complete game shutout against the Kansas City Royals. It was his first career complete game. Gonzalez was optioned down to Triple-A Round Rock July 4, 2015. Gonzalez was diagnosed with a partial tear to the UCL in spring training of 2017. He was declared to need Tommy John surgery, ending his 2017 season plus the whole 2018 season. On November 2, 2018, Gonzalez elected free agency.

Colorado Rockies
On December 4, 2018, Gonzalez signed a minor league deal with the Colorado Rockies. On June 25, 2019, his contract was selected by the Rockies. In 2019, Gonzalez pitched to a 5.29 ERA over 14 games for the Rockies, with 46 strikeouts. In 2020 for the Rockies, Gonzalez pitched to a 6.86 ER He A with 16 strikeouts in 19.2 innings pitched. On December 2, Gonzalez was nontendered by the Rockies. On December 11, 2020, Gonzalez re-signed with the Rockies on a minor league contract. On March 27, 2021, Gonzalez was selected to the 40-man roster. Gonzalez made 24 appearances for the Rockies, going 3–7 with a 6.46 ERA and 56 strikeouts. On October 3, the Rockies designated Gonzalez for assignment. On October 8, Gonzalez elected free agency.

Minnesota Twins
On March 18, 2022, Gonzalez signed a minor league deal with the Minnesota Twins. He had his contract selected on June 3, and was returned to Triple-A on June 4. On June 10, Gonzalez triggered the opt-out clause in his contract, giving Minnesota until the weekend to add him to the 40-man roster or release him. The next day, Gonzalez was selected to the active roster to start against the Tampa Bay Rays. He lasted 4.0 innings, giving up 3 earned runs on 8 hits while striking out 3, and was designated for assignment following the game.

Milwaukee Brewers 
On June 14, 2022, Gonzalez was claimed off waivers by the Milwaukee Brewers after having been designated for assignment by the Minnesota Twins. He made his first start for Milwaukee on June 21, 2022. He was designated for assignment on July 12.

Detroit Tigers
On July 22, 2022, Gonzalez signed a minor league deal with the Tigers and assigned him to the Toledo Mud Hens. On August 26, 2022, he opted out of the minor league contract and was released.

New York Yankees
On August 30, 2022, Gonzalez signed a minor league deal with the New York Yankees. He was called up and made his first start on October 2, 2022 against the Baltimore Orioles. He was designated for assignment on October 3. On October 24, Gonzalez elected free agency.

Miami Marlins
On December 15, 2022, Gonzalez signed a minor league deal with the Miami Marlins.

References

External links

1992 births
Living people
Sportspeople from Delray Beach, Florida
Baseball players from Florida
American sportspeople of Cuban descent
Major League Baseball pitchers
Texas Rangers players
Colorado Rockies players
Minnesota Twins players
Milwaukee Brewers players
New York Yankees players
Oral Roberts Golden Eagles baseball players
Arizona League Rangers players
Spokane Indians players
Myrtle Beach Pelicans players
Frisco RoughRiders players
Round Rock Express players
Albuquerque Isotopes players
Yarmouth–Dennis Red Sox players
Boca Raton Community High School alumni